Robert Edeson (June 3, 1868 – March 24, 1931) was an American film and stage actor of the silent era and a vaudeville performer.

Life and career

Edeson was born  in New Orleans, Louisiana, the son of manager and actor George R. Edeson. After working as treasurer of the Park Theatre in Brooklyn, he initially acted in New York in 1887 in a production of Fascination. He debuted on Broadway in Marriage (1896). His last Broadway appearance was in The World We Live In (1922). He also performed in vaudeville.

Edeson received his first boost in films in 1914 when he starred in the Cecil B. DeMille directed film, The Call of the North (1914).

Edeson replaced actor Rudolph Christians in Erich von Stroheim's production of Foolish Wives (1922), after Christians died of pneumonia. Edeson famously only showed his back to the camera so as not to clash with shot footage of Christians that was still to be used in the completed film.

Edeson's final film was Aloha (1931).

His third wife was the former Aida Banker.

Death
On March 24, 1931, Edeson died at his home in Hollywood. He was 62 years old.

Selected filmography

The Paymaster's Son (1913) as The Paymaster's Son
The Call of the North (1914) as Ned Stewart
The Absentee (1915) as Nathaniel Crosby
The Light That Failed (1916) as Dick Hedlar
 Big Jim Garrity (1916) as Jim Garrity
On the Night Stage (1915) as Austin
The Caveman (1915) as Hanlick Smagg
Public Defender (1917) as Arthur Nelson
Extravagance (1921) as Richard Vane
Foolish Wives (1922) as Andrew J. Hughes
The Prisoner of Zenda (1922) as Colonel Zapta
Sure Fire Flint (1922) as Anthony De Lanni
 Any Night (1922) as Jim Barton
 You Are Guilty (1923) as Theodore Tennent 
The Tie That Binds (1923) as Charles Dodge
The Silent Partner (1923) as Ralph Coombes
To the Last Man (1923) as Gaston Isbel
The Ten Commandments (1923) as Inspector Redding
Feet of Clay (1924) as Dr. Fergus Lansell
Welcome Stranger (1924) as Eb Hooker
Men (1924) as Henri Duval
Triumph (1924) as Samuel Overton
Thy Name Is Woman (1924) as The Commandante
 Missing Daughters (1924) as Secret Service Chief 
The Prairie Pirate (1925) as Don Esteban
Men and Women (1925) as Israel Cohen
The Golden Bed (1925) as Amos Thompson
 Go Straight (1925) as The Hawk
Locked Doors (1925) as Norman Carter
 Blood and Steel (1925) as W.L. Grimshaw
The Volga Boatman (1926) as Prince Nikita
The Clinging Vine (1926) as T. M. Bancroft
The Blue Eagle (1926) as Chaplain Regan
The King of Kings (1927) as Matthew the Apostle
Chicago (1927) as William Flynn
Altars of Desire (1927) as John Sutherland
 The Night Bride (1927)
George Washington Cohen (1928) as Mr. Gorman
A Ship Comes In (1928) as Judge Gresham
Beware of Blondes (1928) as Costigan
Walking Back (1928) as Edgar Thatcher
Dynamite (1929) as Wise Fool
Romance of the Rio Grande (1929) as Don Fernando
Pardon My Gun (1930) as Pa Martin
A Devil with Women (1930) as General Garcia
Danger Lights (1930) as Tom Johnson
The Lash (1930) as Don Mariana Delfine
The Way of All Men (1930) Swift
 Swing High (1930)

References

External links

 
 
 
 a young Robert Edeson on the cover of THE THEATRE magazine September 1905

American male film actors
American male stage actors
American male silent film actors
1868 births
1931 deaths
20th-century American male actors
Burials at Hollywood Forever Cemetery